Emir Mutapčić (born 27 May 1960) is a Bosnian professional basketball coach and former player. He most recently worked as the head coach for Zalaegerszeg of the Hungarian league. Mutapčić competed for Yugoslavia in the 1984 Summer Olympics. He was the  Israeli Premier League Assists Leader in 1990.

References

1960 births
Living people
Forwards (basketball)
Bosnia and Herzegovina men's basketball players
Yugoslav men's basketball players
KK Bosna Royal players
Alba Berlin basketball coaches
Alba Berlin players
Basketball Löwen Braunschweig coaches
Basketball players at the 1984 Summer Olympics
Bosnia and Herzegovina expatriate basketball people in Germany
Bosnia and Herzegovina expatriate basketball people in Israel
Competitors at the 1983 Mediterranean Games
FC Bayern Munich basketball coaches
Hapoel Jerusalem B.C. players
Medalists at the 1984 Summer Olympics
Mediterranean Games gold medalists for Yugoslavia
Mediterranean Games medalists in basketball
Olympic basketball players of Yugoslavia
Olympic bronze medalists for Yugoslavia
Olympic medalists in basketball
Yugoslav expatriate basketball people in Germany
Yugoslav expatriate sportspeople in Israel
1986 FIBA World Championship players